Mingzhi is the Pinyin romanisation of various Chinese given names (e.g. ). These names may also be spelled Ming-chih in the Wade–Giles romanisation which is widespread in Taiwan, or spelled some other way based on romanisations from other varieties of Chinese. Mingzhi is also an era name in Chinese history.

Names of people 
Song Maojin, style name Mingzhi (明之), Ming Dynasty landscape painter
Peng Mingzhi (彭明治; 1905–1993), Chinese general and diplomat
Chua Mia Tee (蔡明智; born 1931), Chinese-born Singaporean painter
Chen Ming-chi (陳明智; born 1947), Taiwanese sprinter
Namewee (born Wee Meng Chee 黃明志, 1983), Malaysian hip hop artist

Chinese era name 
Mingzhi, era name of Zhaoming Emperor of Dali Kingdom, Duan Suying.

See also
Meiji (disambiguation), romanization of Japanese 明治

Chinese given names